The Kautokeino Rebellion is a 2008 film based on the true story of the Kautokeino Rebellion in 1852, in response to the Norwegian exploitation of the Sami community at that time. It was directed by Nils Gaup and was released in January 2008. The music to this film was mostly composed by Sami musician Mari Boine.

Plot

Cast
 Mikael Persbrandt as Carl Johan Ruth
 Michael Nyqvist as Lars Levi Læstadius
 Nils Peder Isaksen Gaup as Mons Somby
 Mikkel Gaup as Aslak Hætta
 Anni-Kristiina Juuso as Ellen Aslaksdatter Skum
 Jørgen Langhelle
 Bjørn Sundquist as Pastor Stockfleth
 Stig Henrik Hoff
 Peter Andersson as Lars Johan Bucht
 Silje Holtet as Anne Elise Blix
 Eirik Junge Eliassen as Prästen Zetliz
 Aslat Mahtte Gaup as Mathis Hætta
 Inger Utsi as Inger Andersdatter Spein
 Ole Nicklas Guttorm as Litle Aslak (son)
 Inga Juuso as Grandmother
 Beaska Niilas as Rasmus Spein
 Jovsset Heandrat as Lars Hætta
 Nikolaj Coster-Waldau as Bishop Juell

Soundtrack
A four-track soundtrack CD with music by Mari Boine, Svein Schultz, and Herman Rundberg was released by Sony/ATV Music Publishing Scandinavia.

Track list
"Elen Skum"
"Válddi vuoigna - The Spirit of Power"
"Deaivideapmi - Confrontation"
"Doaivut ja vuoimmehuvvat - Hope and Defeat"

See also
 Pathfinder (1987 film)

References

External links

2008 drama films
2008 films
Films directed by Nils Gaup
Laestadianism in popular culture
Norwegian drama films
Sámi-language films
Sámi in Norway
Films set in 1852
Films set in Norway

sv:Kautokeinoupproret